The Paragons were a ska and rocksteady vocal group from Kingston, Jamaica, initially active in the 1960s. Their most famous track was "The Tide Is High", written by band member John Holt.

Career
The Paragons were originally Garth "Tyrone" Evans, songwriter Bob Andy, Junior Menz, and Leroy Stamp. In 1964 Stamp was replaced by singer and songwriter John Holt, and Howard Barrett replaced Menz.

The early Paragons sound used the vocal harmonies of Jamaican groups of the early 1960s. Beginning in 1964, they recorded on the Treasure Isle record label with  record producer Duke Reid, songs such as "Memories by the Score", "On the Beach", "Only a Smile" and "Wear You to the Ball", which were later covered by UB40, Horace Andy, Dennis Brown, Massive Attack, and others. Other recordings included "Man Next Door" aka "Quiet Place"/"I've Got to Get Away" (1968) and "Happy Go Lucky Girl".

The Paragons' recordings, including the widely covered "The Tide Is High" from 1967, written by Holt, and featuring the violin of "White Rum" Raymond, are among the highlights of Jamaican popular music. "The Tide Is High" was taken to the top of the UK and US charts by Blondie in 1980; while Atomic Kitten's cover version also topped the UK Singles Chart in 2002.

Holt left to pursue a successful solo career in 1970. Following Holt's departure, the group recorded briefly with female vocalist Roslyn Sweat as Roslyn Sweat & The Paragons and The Paragons (featuring Roslyn Sweat). Evans too, recording as Tyrone Evans and as Don Evans, enjoyed an albeit less notable solo career, making several recordings while with The Paragons and after the group disbanded.

The group reformed in the late 1970s and released further albums in the late 1970s and early 1980s.

Evans died in 2000, and Holt in October 2014. Andy died in 2020.

Discography

Studio albums
 On the Beach (1967)
 With Roslyn Sweat (1974)
 The Paragons (1981)
 Now (1981)
 Positive Movements (1982)
 Heaven & Earth (1996)
 The Paragons Sing the Beatles and Bob Dylan (1998)
 The Legendary Paragons (2000)
 Yellowman Meets the Paragons (2002)
 The Paragons Return

Contributing artist
 The Rough Guide to Reggae (1997, World Music Network)

See also
Crab Records
Jet Set Records
Island Records discography
List of ska musicians
List of reggae musicians

References

External links
[ The Paragons biography] at the AllMusic website
Enotes.com biography

Jamaican reggae musical groups
Rocksteady musical groups
Musical groups disestablished in 1970
Trojan Records artists